Cell Computing was volunteer computing project that was operated by NTT Data to perform biomedical research. 

It used the Berkeley Open Infrastructure for Network Computing (BOINC) platform; however, it was initially launched using the United Devices Grid MP platform in 2002.

The project ended in 2008 due to lack of popularity.

References

External links
 Announce for project ending 

 Science in society
Volunteer computing projects
Health informatics
Projects established in 2002
2008 disestablishments